Kirk S. Lippold (born April 29, 1959) is a former U.S. Navy officer. He was the commanding officer of the United States Navy destroyer  on October 12, 2000, when the ship was attacked and bombed by al-Qaeda terrorists during a refueling stop in the Yemeni port of Aden, killing 17 U.S. sailors. Lippold assumed command of Cole on June 25, 1999, and served until he was relieved on March 9, 2001.

Education
Lippold is a 1981 graduate of the United States Naval Academy. He received a Masters of Science in Systems Engineering (Joint Command, Control and Communications) from the U.S. Naval Postgraduate School, which he attended from 1987 to 1989. He graduated from United States Army Command and General Staff College in 1994 and from Joint Forces Staff College in 2001.

Military
Before serving as commanding officer of USS Cole from 1999 to 2001, Lippold was executive officer on the cruiser . He also served as the operations officer on the commissioning crew of the destroyer , the lead ship of the same destroyer class as Cole. He was division officer aboard the cruiser  and the tank landing ship . Following his departure from Cole, he received a series of desk positions at the Pentagon. Working in the War on Terrorism Division of the Joint Chiefs of Staff, Directorate for Strategic Plans and Policy, Lippold "was instrumental" in the creation of detainee policy in the immediate aftermath of the 9/11 attacks.

A Navy promotion board had selected Lippold for promotion to captain (O-6) in 2002 but he was not confirmed by the United States Senate, this despite a 2001 Navy investigation that concluded that Lippold and his crew probably could not have prevented the attack and should not be punished (although investigators found that had Lippold followed twelve safety procedures, among several dozen which were not observed per the existing security requirements in Aden, the attack could have been mitigated or prevented). Subsequent Navy promotion boards continued to select Lippold for captain, and in all cases the selection was subsequently struck down by the Senate. On August 22, 2006, the Associated Press reported that Secretary of the Navy Donald C. Winter removed Lippold  from the promotion list. Secretary of the Navy Winter concluded after reviewing the matter that Lippold's actions before the attack on October 12, 2000, "...did not meet the high standard..." expected of the Navy's commanding officers. Based on that assessment, Winter determined that Lippold was "...not the best and fully qualified for promotion to the higher grade..." of Captain and struck him from being further eligible for promotion.

Lippold's final U.S. Navy assignment was to the Office of the Chief of Naval Operations in the International Strategy Division. He retired as a commander in May 2007 at the age of 48 during a ceremony at the United States Navy Memorial in Washington, D.C.

Civilian career 
Lippold is a senior military fellow with Military Families United, an advocacy group opposed to the release of prisoners held at Guantanamo Bay Naval Base.

On June 22, 2009, The Washington Times published an op-ed by Lippold that was critical of the Barack Obama administration, for not showing enough sympathy to American victims of terror. Lippold asserted that the families of the victims of terror should play a role in deciding which terror suspects should be tried, and in which kind of court they should be tried.

On February 4, 2010, the Las Vegas Review-Journal reported that Lippold was considering a run for U.S. Senate in Nevada against Harry Reid. He did not enter the race. Instead, he ran for the Republican nomination in the 2011 Nevada 2nd congressional district special election. He lost to Mark Amodei and declined to run as an Independent.

On December 12, 2012, Phillip Stutts & Company Inc., a political marketing organization, announced that Lippold was joining the firm as Senior Vice President for Military Policy and Strategic Development.

On October 12, 2015, the fifteenth anniversary of the bombing of USS Cole, Lippold appeared on Your World Cavuto and repeated his call from 2009 for justice for the Cole victims.

References

External links
 Official website of USS Cole
 navsource.org: USS Cole
 Official Department of Defense FOIA files on the USS Cole   
 

United States Naval Academy alumni
Naval Postgraduate School alumni
Living people
United States Navy officers
Recipients of the Legion of Merit
United States Army Command and General Staff College alumni
Place of birth missing (living people)
1959 births
Recipients of the Defense Superior Service Medal
Nevada Republicans